Vinogradov's jerboa (Scarturus vinogradovi) is a species of rodent in the family Dipodidae.
It is found in Kazakhstan, Kyrgyzstan, Tajikistan, and Uzbekistan.

References

Allactaga
Mammals of Asia
Taxonomy articles created by Polbot
Mammals described in 1941